Raymond Restaurand (1627–1682) was a French physician born in Pont-Saint-Esprit.  Restaurand published numerous works, sometimes in the form of pamphlets, discussing medicine and its history. Some of his topics included commentaries on ancient philosophers and practitioners such as Hippocrates.

References

1627 births
1682 deaths
17th-century French physicians